Scheltema is a surname. Notable people with the surname include:

Amelie Hains Scheltema (1928–2015), American malacologist
Renée Scheltema (born 1951), Dutch documentary filmmaker
Jan Hendrik Scheltema (1861-1941), Dutch, later Australian painter; first portraitist, in Australia landscape and livestock painter.